The 55th Golden Horse Awards took place on November 17, 2018 at the Sun Yat-sen Memorial Hall in Taipei, Taiwan. Organized by the Taipei Golden Horse Film Festival Executive Committee, the awards honored the best in Chinese-language films of 2017 and 2018. The ceremony was hosted by Matilda Tao and televised by TTV.

Winners and nominees

References

External links
 Official website of the Golden Horse Awards

55th
2018 film awards
2018 in Taiwan